Malcolm Mejin is a Malaysian author of contemporary adult novels and children's books. He is the author of the national bestselling novel series, Diary of a Rich Kid.

Bibliography
 Diary of a Rich Kid (2018–present) (series)
 Cool Diary (2012)
 Ivan Joe (story series), for Pelangi Scientist
 Zany Zombie (2010–present) (series)
 Women in Boots (short story), shortlisted in the MPH Search for Young Writers competition and appears in the 2005 collection, Rewind, Fast Forward: An Anthology.

References 

Living people
Malaysian writers
1980s births